Creal may refer to:

 A philosophical concept developed by Luis de Miranda
 CREAL (Center for Research on Educational Access and Leadership), a Think tank
 C-REAL, a South Korean girl group
 C:Real , a Greek pop rock band

People 
 C-Real (rapper) (born 1984), Ghanaian entertainer
 Cecil Creal (1899–1986), mayor of Ann Arbor, Michigan
 Edward W. Creal (1883–1943), US Representative from Kentucky
 Rose Ann Creal (1865–1921), Australian WWI army nurse

See also 
 Creel (disambiguation)